Ahmed Albasheer (Arabic: أحمد البشير; born 17 October 1984) is an Iraqi comedian, journalist, and director, best known as the creator and host of the weekly political satire show Albasheer Show. He was named one of the twenty most influential people in the Arab world by the Global Influence Research Centre.

Early life 
Albasheer was born and raised in Baghdad, Iraq, He lost several family members during the Iraq War, including his brother and father, and was himself kidnapped and tortured by a militia in 2005. Albasheer trained as a journalist at Nahrain University in Baghdad and went on to work for state-owned Iraqi television.

Career 
Until 2011, Albasheer worked for eight years as a political correspondent for Iraq's state-run news channels.

In 2012, after moving to Jordan, Albasheer established his own media production company, Lagash, which in 2014 began broadcasting his eponymous show, Albasheer Show. Heavily influenced by Jon Stewart, who hosted the American political satire show The Daily Show from 1999 until 2015, the show satirised Iraqi politics, including ongoing corruption, sectarianism, extremism and terrorism. By 2015, the show had attained an audience of 19 million, over half of Iraq's total population. The show has changed channels multiple times since its premiere due to threats from the Iraqi Communications and Media Commission, and is currently broadcast from outside of Iraq on Deutsche Welle's Arabic channel, in addition to on YouTube, where the show has amassed over five million subscribers as of 2021. Albasheer Show has been cited as playing an integral role in the ongoing anti-government 2019-2021 Iraqi protests.

In 2019, Albasheer received a Maurice R. Greenberg World Fellowship at Yale University.

He appeared in the Netflix documentary series Larry Charles’ Dangerous World of Comedy in 2019.

In 2020, Albasheer featured in the critically acclaimed documentary series Once Upon a Time in Iraq.

Personal life 
In 2011, after being injured in a suicide bombing, Albasheer moved to Amman, Jordan, where he resided until 2019.

References

External links 
 
 
 Ahmed Albasheer in YouTube

1984 births
Living people
Iraqi comedians
Iraqi television directors
Iraqi mass media people
People from Baghdad
People from Ramadi
Free speech activists